Barkley Sound, also known historically as Barclay Sound, is south of Ucluelet and north of Bamfield on the west coast of Vancouver Island and forms the entrance to the Alberni Inlet. The Broken Group archipelago lies in the sound. Barkley Sound is part of the traditional territory of the Nuu-cha-nulth First Nations. Barkley traveled with his 17-year-old bride, Frances Barkley, the first European woman to visit what is now British Columbia.

In 1791, the Spanish ship , under Juan Carrasco and José María Narváez, explored Barkley Sound in detail. The Spanish named it Boca de Carrasco. Another Spanish name in common use at the time was Entrada Nitinat.

Remarkably, it was in good condition, with much of the original paint remaining. The boat's nameplate is now on display in the Maritime Museum of British Columbia.

External links
 Barkley Sound page, VancouverIsland.com

References

Alberni Valley
Barkley Sound region
Sounds of British Columbia